George Tupou can refer to:
George Tupou I (1797–1893), king of Tonga
George Tupou II (1874–1918), king of Tonga
George Tupou V (1948–2012), king of Tonga

See also 
List of monarchs of Tonga